Pseudosophronia exustellus is a moth of the family Gelechiidae. It was described by Philipp Christoph Zeller in 1847. It is found in Portugal, Spain, France, Italy, and on Sicily.

References

Moths described in 1847
Anacampsini